Second Childhood may refer to:

 Second Childhood (film), 1936 Our Gang short
 Edmund Burke (1729–1797), English statesman and philosopher who used this pen-name
 Second Childhood, the second album by singer-songwriter Phoebe Snow, released 1976

See also 
 Senility 
 Senile dementia